Tina Vogelmann  (born 24 March 1985) is a German professional pool player.

Career 
She began playing pool at the age of 17. From 2002 to 2004 she played in the youth performance squad. In 2004 she completed her training as a C-trainer. Since the summer of 2004 she plays at BSF Kurpfalz and has been in the women's performance squad ever since. In 2008 she was inducted into the German national team.

Since 2007, Tina Vogelmann has won several national titles and participated in international competitions. So she reached the fifth place in the German Championship 2007 in the Women's Combined Team, the third place in the 8-Ball ladies singles and eventually won the German championship in the 9-Ball event.

Vogelmann reached her first semi-final of an event on the Euro Tour, at the 2017 Austria Open. She would once again reach the semi-final again at the 2019 Veldhoven Open. The next event, the 2019 Antalya Open, she reached the final, before losing to Oliwia Zalewska 6–7.

References

External links

1985 births
German pool players
Living people